Tessem is a Norwegian surname. Notable people with the surname include:

 Jo Tessem (born 1972), Norwegian footballer
 Peter Tessem, Norwegian carpenter and member of Roald Amundsen's 1918 Arctic expedition

See also
 Tesser
 Tjessem

Norwegian-language surnames